Yeznabad (also Azerbaijani as Yezna abad) is a village in Dowlatabad Rural District, in the Central District of Namin County, Ardabil Province, Azerbaijan, Iran. The word is probably driven from Azerbaijani words "yezna" (meaning groom)and "abad" (meaning city). People are mostly farmers in this village and at the 2006 census, its population was 1,041, in 208 families. People speak Azerbaijani in this village. During the last years, population of the village has drastically decreased due to immigration to bigger cities.

References 

Towns and villages in Namin County